The Great Hsi-Ku Arsenal was a Qing dynasty imperial arsenal that stored munitions, rifles, and millions of rounds of ammunition. In addition tons of rice and medical supplies were stored there. The facility was guarded by Qing imperial troops using rifles and Krupp field guns mounted as defensive batteries. On the banks of the Pei-ho River, it was located approximately eight miles northwest of Tientsin, China.

It was principal in providing an impromptu safe haven for western troops retreating from a failed rescue attempt (Seymour Relief Expedition) of the Beijing foreign legations during the 1900 Boxer Rebellion in China.

See also
Self-Strengthening Movement
Hanyang Arsenal
Taiyuan Arsenal
Foochow Arsenal
Jiangnan Shipyard

References

Military history of the Qing dynasty
Arsenals
Firearm manufacturers of China
History of Tianjin
Economy of Tianjin